The Picket Range is a small, extremely rugged subrange of the North Cascades in the northwestern part of the American state of Washington. It is entirely contained within North Cascades National Park.

Swedish American Lage Wernstedt of the U.S. Forest Service mapped the Picket Range in the 1920s and named it for its resemblance to a picket fence (and not for George Pickett). Wernstedt was also apparently responsible for the names of the main peaks, including Mt. Challenger, Fury, Terror, and Phantom. These names first appeared on maps in 1931.

There are few trails in the Picket Range, and any excursion there has a strong wilderness character. Most of the access points are characterized as steep brush thick valleys, with little open terrain. Many of the peaks are challenging rock climbs. The rock is biotite gneiss, formed by metamorphism of sedimentary and volcanic rocks about 100 million years ago.

The Picket Range is home to many of the North Cascades' classic climbs and many of its best technical climbs. The rugged terrain has attracted many photographers to the range, creating some of the most spectacular images in the national park. The rugged and sharp peaks are unmatched in steepness and jaggedness by any other ranges in the lower 48 American states. This has made it a popular area in the National Park, and has contributed to the Cascades' title of "The American Alps".

A theodolite survey of West and East Fury on Oct 22, 2022, established the altitudes of the two peaks of Fury.  West Fury was set at 8,305ft +/-10 feet and East Fury as 8,356 +/- 8ft.   This moved Luna Peak from the highest mountain in the Picket Range to the second highest.

Notable Peaks of the Picket Range

See also
 List of mountain ranges in Washington

References

External links

 The Picket Range on Summitpost

 Photo of entire Picket Range: Flickr

North Cascades of Washington (state)
Mountain ranges of Washington (state)
North Cascades National Park